Dușești may refer to several villages in Romania:

 Duşeşti, a village in Ceica Commune, Bihor County
 Dușești, a village in Ștefan cel Mare Commune, Neamț County